Seobuk-gu is a non-autonomous district in the city of Cheonan in South Chungcheong Province, South Korea.

Administrative divisions 
Seobuk-gu is divided into 3 towns (eup), one township (myeon), and 9 neighbourhoods (dong).

See also 
 Dongnam-gu

References

External links 
  

Districts of Cheonan